Kentwood High School is a high school in Covington, Washington. Kentwood is one of four high schools in the Kent School District. It serves students in grades nine through twelve who live in mainly in the east central region of the district. Its main feeder schools are Mattson and Meridian Middle Schools.

Kentwood is one of Washington's largest high schools; its enrollment of more than 2,000 students even exceeds the enrollment of most other 4A high schools in the state. Kentwood High School's mascot is the Conquerors, or  the "Conks".

Academics 

Kentwood High School, offers Advanced Placement classes in US History, European History, Macroeconomics, Microeconomics, Art, Literature, Statistics, Calculus (AB and BC), Music Theory, Biology, Chemistry, Physics B,  Language and Composition, Psychology, and Government for Megaminds. The availability of these classes is contingent upon enough registrations for them. AP Music Theory and AP Statistics in particular deal with this problem.

At Kentwood, freshmen and sophomores are placed into English, Social Studies classes and depending upon past grades and test scores.

Foreign Language classes available for students to take are French (4 years), Spanish (4 years), American Sign Language (4 years), Japanese (4 years), and Mandarin Chinese (4 years). Upper level (third or fourth year) French and Spanish classes offer college credit to students who participate in the University of Washington's College in the high school program.

In addition, Kentwood High School was also one of 41 schools in the country named a Grammy Signature in 2004 for their Music Program, which included a check for $1000 USD as a donation to the program.

Sports

Kentwood's sports teams compete in the Cascade Division of the North Puget Sound League since the 2016-17 school year.

Boys

Football
Cross Country
Golf
Basketball
Swim and Dive
Wrestling

Baseball
Track and Field
Soccer
Judo

Girls

Volleyball
Cross Country
Swim and Dive
Golf
Soccer
Gymnastics
Basketball
 
Wrestling
Softball
Track and Field
Tennis
Judo
Cheerleading
Dazzlers Dance Team

Kentwood students can also participate in district-wide Kent Crusaders Rugby and Kentwood Water Polo.

Kentwood Football won the Washington State 4A Championship in both 2001 & 2002.

In addition, Kentwood also has an outstanding swim team that continues to make excellent progress each year, with a swimmer breaking a state record during the 2018-2019 season.

Notable alumni  
 Ernie Conwell (1988–1991) - retired tight end who played for the St. Louis Rams and the New Orleans Saints.
 Isis Gee (née Tamara Wimer) (1988–1991) - Polish pop music star
 Matt Hague, MLB player (former member of Toronto Blue Jays 40-man roster)
 Anthony Hamilton, professional MMA fighter in the UFC's Heavyweight Division
 Mike Karney (1996–1999) - fullback for the St. Louis Rams
 Jeremiah Green - drummer for Modest Mouse (See We Were Dead Before the Ship Even Sank)
 Rodney Stuckey (2001–2004) - Drafted and played guard for the Detroit Pistons and the Indiana Pacers.
 Cam Weaver (1999–2002) - retired soccer forward
 Jeff Dye - comedian/3rd-place finisher on Last Comic Standing
 Stefano Langone (2004–2007) - Season 10 American Idol contestant
 Courtney Vandersloot (2004–2007) - guard for the Chicago Sky
 Reese McGuire (2018-) catcher for the Boston Red Sox of Major League Baseball.
 Lindsey Moore 2006-2009 - guard for the Minnesota Lynx
 Demitrius Bronson former NFL running back Seattle Seahawks
 Joshua Smith (2006-2010) NBA player for the Houston Rockets
The Fung Brothers (Andrew Fung & David Fung) - YouTubers
Austin Voth, MLB pitcher for the Baltimore Orioles
Taylor Jones, MLB player for the San Francisco Giants
Mathew Barzal, NHL player for the New York Islanders

References 
3. "Rodney Stuckey". Indiana Pacers 

Educational institutions established in 1981
High schools in King County, Washington
South Puget Sound League
Education in Kent, Washington
Public high schools in Washington (state)
1981 establishments in Washington (state)